Janaisa Morandin (born October 31, 1994) is a  mixed martial artist (MMA) from Brazil, and competes in Invicta Fighting Championships in Strawweight division.

Mixed martial arts career

Early career 
Morandins started her professional MMA career in 2013 and fought primarily in Brazil. She amassed a record of 9-0 prior to being signed by Invicta.

Invicta Fighting Championships
Morandin made her Invicta debut on August 31, 2017, at Invicta FC 25: Kunitskaya vs. Pa'aluhi against Lívia Renata Souza. She lost the fight via unanimous decision.

Morandin was scheduled to face Mizuki Inoue on December 8, 2017, at  Invicta FC 26: Maia vs. Niedwiedz for the Invicta strawweight championship. She won the fight via unanimous decision. However, Inoue was forced to pull out and she was replaced by Kinberly Tanaka Novaes.

On September 1, 2018, Morandin faced Virna Jandiroba at Invicta FC 31: Jandiroba vs. Morandin for the  Invicta FC Strawweight Championship.  She lost the fight via a submission in round two.

Morandin is scheduled to faced Emily Ducote on August 9, 2019, at Invicta FC 36: Sorenson vs. Young. She lost by first-round KO.

Morandin faced Montserrat Ruiz on July 30, 2020, at Invicta FC 41: Morandin vs. Ruiz. She lost the bout through first round scarf hold keylock submission.

Morandin faced Liana Pirosin on May 11, 2022, at Invicta FC 47. She lost the close bout via split decision.

Championships and accomplishments

Mixed martial arts 
 Aspera Fighting Championship
 Aspera Fighting Championship Strawweight Champion

Mixed martial arts record

|-
|Loss
|align=center| 10–5
|Liana Pirosin
|Decision (split)
|Invicta FC 47: Ducote vs. Zappitella
|
|align=center|3
|align=center|5:00
|Kansas City, Kansas, United States
|
|-
| Loss
| align=center| 10–4
| Montserrat Ruiz
| Submission (scarf hold keylock)
| Invicta FC 41: Morandin vs. Ruiz
| 
| align=center| 1
| align=center| 3:28
| Kansas City, Kansas, United States
|
|-
| Loss
| align=center| 10–3
| Emily Ducote
| KO (punches)
| Invicta FC 36: Sorenson vs. Young
| 
| align=center| 1
| align=center| 4:03
| Kansas City, Kansas, United States
|
|-
| Loss
| align=center| 10–2
| Virna Jandiroba
| Submission (arm-triangle choke)
| Invicta FC 31: Jandiroba vs. Morandin
| 
| align=center| 2
| align=center| 2:23
| Kansas City, Missouri, United States
||
|-
| Win
| align=center| 10–1
| Kinberly Tanaka Novaes
| Decision (unanimous)
| Invicta FC 26: Maia vs. Niedwiedz
| 
| align=center| 3
| align=center| 5:00
| Kansas City, Missouri, United States
|
|-
| Loss
| align=center| 9–1
| Lívia Renata Souza
| Decision (unanimous)
| Invicta FC 25: Kunitskaya vs. Pa'aluhi
| 
| align=center| 3
| align=center| 5:00
| Lemoore, California, United States
|
|-
| Win
| align=center| 9–0
| Paula Vieira da Silva
| TKO (doctor stoppage)
| Aspera FC 44
| 
| align=center| 2
| align=center| 5:00
| Sao Paulo, Brazil
|
|-
| Win
| align=center| 8–0
| Lavinia Ione
| TKO (punches)
| Aspera FC 38
| 
| align=center| 2
| align=center| 1:50
| Sao Paulo, Brazil
|
|-
| Win
| align=center| 7–0
| Arielle Souza
| Decision (unanimous)
| MMA Super Heroes 6
| 
| align=center| 3
| align=center| 5:00
| Sao Paulo, Brazil
|
|-
| Win
| align=center| 6–0
| Cynthia Candido
| TKO (knees and punches)
| Aspera FC 11
| 
| align=center| 2
| align=center| 1:12
| Santa Catarina, Brazil
|
|-
| Win
| align=center| 5–0
| Mariana Oliveira
| TKO (punches and knees)
| Aspera FC 10
| 
| align=center| 1
| align=center| 0:16
| Santa Catarina, Brazil
|
|-
| Win
| align=center| 4–0
| Ana Luiza de Jesus
| Submission (rear-naked choke)
| Aspera FC 7
| 
| align=center| 1
| align=center| 0:59
| Santa Catarina, Brazil
|
|-
| Win
| align=center| 3–0
| Helaine Ribeiro
| Decision (split)
| Aspera FC 3
| 
| align=center| 3
| align=center| 5:00
| Santa Catarina, Brazil
|
|-
| Win
| align=center| 2–0
| Thayani Cristine
| TKO (retirement)
| Sparta MMA 10
| 
| align=center| 1
| align=center| 5:00
| Santa Catarina, Brazil
|
|-
| Win
| align=center| 1–0
| Thayani Cristine
| Decision (unanimous)
| Sparta MMA 7
| 
| align=center| 3
| align=center| 5:00
| Santa Catarina, Brazil
|
|-

See also
List of current Invicta FC fighters
List of female mixed martial artists

References

External links
 
 Janaisa Morandin at Invicta FC

Living people
1989 births
Strawweight mixed martial artists
Mixed martial artists utilizing boxing
Mixed martial artists utilizing Brazilian jiu-jitsu
Brazilian female mixed martial artists
Brazilian practitioners of Brazilian jiu-jitsu
Female Brazilian jiu-jitsu practitioners
People from Erechim
Sportspeople from Rio Grande do Sul